The Ziegfeld Follies were a series of elaborate theatrical revue productions on Broadway in New York City from 1907 to 1931, with renewals in 1934 and 1936. They became a radio program in 1932 and 1936 as The Ziegfeld Follies of the Air.

Founding and history
Inspired by the Folies Bergère of Paris, the Ziegfeld Follies were conceived and mounted by Florenz Ziegfeld Jr., reportedly at the suggestion of his then-wife, the stage actress and singer Anna Held. The shows' producers were turn-of-the-twentieth-century producing titans Klaw and Erlanger.

The Follies were a series of lavish revues, something between later Broadway shows and the more elaborate high class vaudeville and variety show. The first follies, The Follies of 1907, was produced that year at the Jardin de Paris roof theatre.

During the Follies era, many of the top entertainers, including W. C. Fields, Eddie Cantor, Josephine Baker, Fanny Brice, Ann Pennington, Bert Williams, Eva Tanguay, Bob Hope, Will Rogers, Ruth Etting, Ray Bolger, Helen Morgan, Louise Brooks, Marilyn Miller, Ed Wynn, Gilda Gray, Nora Bayes and Sophie Tucker appeared in the shows.

The Ziegfeld Follies were also famous for their display of many beautiful chorus girls, commonly known as Ziegfeld Girls, who "paraded up and down flights of stairs as anything from birds to battleships." They usually wore elaborate costumes by designers such as Erté, Lady Duff-Gordon and Ben Ali Haggin.

The "tableaux vivants" were designed by Ben Ali Haggin from 1917 to 1925. Joseph Urban was the scenic designer for the Follies shows starting in 1915.

After Ziegfeld's death his widow, actress Billie Burke, authorized use of his name for Ziegfeld Follies in 1934 and 1936 to Jake Shubert, who then produced the Follies.  The name was later used by other promoters in New York City, Philadelphia, and again on Broadway, with less connection to the original Follies. These later efforts failed miserably. When the show toured, the 1934 edition was recorded in its entirety, from the overture to play-out music, on a series of 78 rpm discs, which were edited by the record producer David Cunard to form an album of the highlights of the production and which was released as a CD in 1997.

Films based on the Ziegfeld Follies

In 1937, at the 9th Academy Awards, the Metro-Goldwyn-Mayer film, The Great Ziegfeld produced the previous year won the Best Picture (called "Outstanding Production"), starring William Powell as Florenz Ziegfeld, Jr. and co-starring Myrna Loy (as Ziegfeld's second wife Billie Burke), Luise Rainer (as Anna Held, which won her an Academy Award for Best Actress), and Frank Morgan as Jack Billings. Featuring numbers by Ray Bolger, Dennis Morgan, Virginia Bruce, and Harriet Hoctor, the film gave a glimpse into what the Follies were really like. The show-stopper was the Irving Berlin-composed "A Pretty Girl Is Like a Melody", which, by itself, cost more to produce than one of Ziegfeld's entire stage shows.

In 1941 MGM released Ziegfeld Girl, starring Judy Garland, Lana Turner, Hedy Lamarr, James Stewart and Tony Martin. The film was set in the 1920s. Celebrated numbers from Ziegfeld Revues were recreated, including the famed "Wedding Cake" set which had been used for Metro's earlier film, The Great Ziegfeld. Judy Garland was filmed on the top of the cake. Charles Winninger, who had performed in the Follies of 1920, appeared as "Ed Gallagher"  with Gallagher's real-life partner, Al Shean to recreate the duo's famous song "Mister Gallagher and Mister Shean". According to modern sources, Turner's character was modeled after Ziegfeld Girl Lillian Lorraine, who suffered a drunken fall into the orchestra pit during an extravagant number.

In 1946 MGM released a third feature film based on Ziegfeld's shows titled Ziegfeld Follies with Fred Astaire, Judy Garland, Lena Horne, William Powell (as Ziegfeld), Gene Kelly, Fanny Brice, Red Skelton, Esther Williams, Cyd Charisse, Lucille Ball, Kathryn Grayson, and others performing songs and sketches similar to those from the original Follies. Ziegfeld Follies was awarded the "Grand Prix de la Comedie Musicale" at the Cannes Film Festival in 1947, and received an Academy Award nomination for Best Art Direction-Set Decoration (black and white).

The 1964 stage musical Funny Girl, starring Barbra Streisand as Fanny Brice, depicts Fanny Brice's success with the Follies. The 1968 Columbia Pictures film of Funny Girl also starred Barbra Streisand as Brice and Walter Pidgeon as Florenz Ziegfeld.

The Follies

Follies of 1907, 1908, 1909, 1910 at the Jardin de Paris
Ziegfeld Follies of 1911 at the Jardin de Paris
Ziegfeld Follies of 1912 at the Moulin Rouge
Ziegfeld Follies of 1913, 1914, 1915, 1916, 1917, 1918, 1919, 1920 at the New Amsterdam Theatre
Ziegfeld Follies of 1921 at the Globe Theatre
Ziegfeld Follies of 1922, 1923, 1924, 1925, 1927 at the New Amsterdam Theatre
Ziegfeld Follies of 1931 at the Ziegfeld Theatre
Ziegfeld Follies of 1934 at the Winter Garden Theatre
Ziegfeld Follies of 1936 at the Winter Garden Theatre
Ziegfeld Follies of 1943, 1957 at the Winter Garden Theatre

List of performers by year

1907
Nora Bayes (joined the cast later in run)
Helen Broderick
Emma Carus 
Mlle. Dazie
Grace La Rue
Edna Luby
Harry Watson Jr.

1908
Nora Bayes
Mlle. Dazie
Grace La Rue
Harry Watson Jr.
The Ziegfeld Girls (including Mae Murray)
Marjorie Bonner

1909
Nora Bayes
Bessie Clayton
Lillian Lorraine
Jack Norworth
Sophie Tucker
The Ziegfeld Girls

1910
Fanny Brice
Anna Held (in a filmed sequence)
Lillian Lorraine
Bert Williams
The Ziegfeld Girls
Bobby North

1911
Fanny Brice
Bert Williams
The Dolly Sisters
Leon Errol
Lillian Lorraine
Vera Maxwell
Bessie McCoy
Bert Williams
The Ziegfeld Girls (including Jeanne Eagels)

1912
Bernard Granville
Leon Errol
Lillian Lorraine
Josie Sadler
Rae Samuels
Harry Watson Jr.
Bert Williams
The Ziegfeld Girls

1913
Elizabeth Brice
Leon Errol
Jose Collins
Ann Pennington
Frank Tinney
Nat M. Wills
The Ziegfeld Girls 

1914
Leon Errol
Annette Kellermann
Vera Maxwell
Vera Michelena
Ann Pennington
Bert Williams
Ed Wynn
The Ziegfeld Girls

1915
Bernard Granville
Ina Claire
Leon Errol
W. C. Fields
Justine Johnstone
Mae Murray
Ann Pennington
Ed Wynn
Bert Williams
The Ziegfeld Girls (including Helen Barnes, Marion Davies, Odette Myrtil and Olive Thomas)

1916
Fanny Brice
Ina Claire
W. C. Fields
Allyn King
Bird Millman
Ann Pennington
Will Rogers
Bert Williams
Marion Davies 
Bernard Granville
The Ziegfeld Girls (including Irene Hayes, Julanne Johnston and Lilyan Tashman)

1917
Diana Allen
Elvira Amazar 
Fanny Brice
Eddie Cantor
Dolores
The Fairbanks Twins
Allyn King
William E. Ritchie
Will Rogers
Lilyan Tashman
Bert Williams
The Ziegfeld Girls (including Peggy Hopkins Joyce)

1918
Jay Brennan
Eddie Cantor
Frank Carter
The Fairbanks Twins
W. C. Fields
Joe Frisco
Pauline Hall
Kay Laurell
Lillian Lorraine
Allyn King
Marilyn Miller
Ann Pennington
Bert Savoy
The Ziegfeld Girls (including Doris Eaton, Martha Mansfield and Nita Naldi)

1919
Eddie Cantor
DeLyle Alda
Johnny and Ray Dooley
Eddie Dowling
The Fairbanks Twins
Margaret Fitzgerald
Allyn King
Bette Morton
Marilyn Miller
Van and Schenck
John Steel
Bert Williams
The Ziegfeld Girls (including Billie Dove and Mary Hay)

1920
Fanny Brice
DeLyle Alda
Eddie Cantor 
Jack Donahue
Ray Dooley
Mary Eaton
W. C. Fields
Bernard Granville
Art Hickman's Orchestra
Allyn King
Moran and Mack
Van and Schenck
Charles Winninger
The Ziegfeld Girls (including Juliette Compton and Dorothy Mackaill)

1921
Fanny Brice
Mary Eaton
W. C. Fields
Raymond Hitchcock
Vera Michelena
Van and Schenck
The Ziegfeld Girls (including Anastasia Reilly and Mary Nolan)
Germaine Mitti and Eugene Tillio

1922
Mary Eaton
Gallagher and Shean
Gilda Gray
Nervo and Knox
Olsen and Johnson
Will Rogers
Jack Whiting
The Ziegfeld Girls (including Barbara Stanwyck and Geneva Mitchell)

1923
Fanny Brice
James J. Corbett
Ann Pennington
Bert & Betty Wheeler
Paul Whiteman
The Ziegfeld Girls (including Lina Basquette and Dolores Costello)

1924–25
Billie Burke
Ray Dooley (joined the cast later in run)
W. C. Fields (joined the cast later in run)
Lupino Lane
Ann Pennington
Will Rogers
Vivienne Segal
Ethel Shutta
Frank Tinney
Dorothy Wegman
Blanche Satchel 
Bertha Belmore
The Ziegfeld Girls (including Louise Brooks, Claire Dodd, Peggy Fears and Dorothy Sebastian)

1927
Eddie Cantor
Cliff Edwards
Ruth Etting
Frances Upton
The Brox Sisters
Claire Luce
Dorothy Wegman
The Ziegfeld Girls (including Joan Blondell, Lilian Bond and Paulette Goddard)

1931
Faith Bacon
Buck & Bubbles
Albert Carroll
Dorothy Dell
Pearl E'doire
Ruth Etting
Helen Morgan
Agatha Hoff
Hal Le Roy
Mitzi Mayfair
Ernest McChesney
Jack Pearl
Harry Richman
The Ziegfeld Girls (including Iris Adrian, Virginia Biddle, Jean Howard, Mona Louise Parsons, and Zecil Silvonia)

1934
Eve Arden
Fanny Brice
Robert Cummings
Buddy and Vilma Ebsen 
Jane Froman
Patricia Bowman
Agatha Hoff
Willie and Eugene Howard
Everett Marshall
June and Cherry Preisser
The Ziegfeld Girls

1936
Eve Arden
Fanny Brice
Josephine Baker
Judy Canova
Bobby Clark (replacement)
George Church
Cass Daley (replacement)
Harriet Hoctor
Bob Hope
Gypsy Rose Lee (replacement)
The Nicholas Brothers
Gertrude Niesen
June and Cherry Preisser
The Ziegfeld Girls

1943
Bil and Cora Baird
Milton Berle
Eric Blore (replacement) 
Jack Carter (replacement)
Jack Cole
Howard Jackson
Ilona Massey
Dean Murphy
Arthur Treacher
Tommy Wonder
The Ziegfeld Girls

1956 (Boston)
Bea Arthur
Tallulah Bankhead
Carol Haney
Julie Newmar
The Ziegfeld Girls

1957
Billy DeWolfe
Harold Lang
Carol Lawrence
Beatrice Lillie
Jane Morgan
The Ziegfeld Girls

Ziegfeld girls

Adaptations / In popular culture
The 1912 version of the Ziegfeld Follies included a song entitled Row, Row, Row, which has been adapted by two football clubs in two different codes as its club song.

In 1962, cabaret singer Jack Malcolmson, who was performing at the Richmond Football Club (Australian rules) Social Club in Richmond, Melbourne, adapted the song into the Tigers' new club song, We're From Tigerland, at the request of Richmond committee member Alf Barnett. (Previously, Richmond's club song had been Onward The Tigers, to the tune of Waltzing Matilda.) In 2014, Melbourne's Herald Sun ranked We're From Tigerland as the best club song of any Australian Football League team. Official versions of the song include a 1972 recording by the Fable Singers, who recorded most AFL club songs, and a 2018 recording including Richmond legends Matthew Richardson and Kevin Bartlett.

Row, Row, Row has also been adapted by America Football Club in Rio de Janeiro as its anthem, the Hino do America, with America supporter and famous Brazilian composer Lamartine Babo helping adapt the song.

The 1971 Stephen Sondheim musical Follies takes place at a reunion of showgirls from the Weissman Follies, a fictional revue inspired by the Ziegfeld Follies. In addition to featuring "ghosts" of statuesque showgirls from the heyday of the revues, the musical includes many songs and production numbers that are intended to evoke the types of entertainment typically featured in the Ziegfeld Follies and other revues of the period. Examples include parade of showgirls ("Beautiful Girls"); a torch song ("Losing My Mind"); a baggy pants comic song ("The God-Why-Don't-You-Love-Me Blues"); and a novelty song ("Rain on the Roof").

In The Drowsy Chaperone there is a character by the name of Victor Feldzieg, the producer of Feldzieg's Follies, a parody of Ziegfeld Follies.

The TV show, Boardwalk Empire, portraying crime and corruption in 1920s Atlantic City, New Jersey, features a character that is a former Follies dancer, Lucy Danziger. Lucy is one of Nucky Thompson's girlfriends in the first season of the show. Lucy is portrayed by actress Paz de la Huerta.

See also

 Academy of Music/Riviera Theatre
 By the Light of the Silvery Moon
 Encores!
 Esther's Follies
 The Fabulous Palm Springs Follies
 Alfred Cheney Johnston
 The Passing Show
 Joseph Urban
 Ziegfeld Theatre

References

External links

 Ziegfeld on Musicals101.com
 Ziegfeld Follies at Internet Broadway Database

 
Musicals by Irving Berlin
1907 musicals
Broadway musicals
Dance companies in the United States
Dance in New York City